The Estádio do Dragão (English: Dragon Stadium) is an all-seater football stadium in Porto, Portugal, and the home ground of FC Porto since 2003. It has a seating capacity of 50,033, making it the third largest football stadium in Portugal.

Designed by Portuguese architect Manuel Salgado, the stadium was constructed to replace Porto's former ground, the Estádio das Antas, along with becoming one of the host venues for the UEFA Euro 2004 final tournament. The inauguration took place on 16 November 2003 with a friendly match against Barcelona, setting an attendance record of 52,000 spectators.

A UEFA category four stadium, it has held several international club and national team competition matches, including the 2019 UEFA Nations League Final and 2021 UEFA Champions League Final.

Construction and inauguration
Construction works began in late 2001, and were completed in November 2003, some months after what was expected, since in February 2002, Porto mayor Rui Rio changed the estate distribution, criticizing the plan for including high-scale housing and shopping for the area. These actions forced the chairman of FC Porto, Jorge Nuno Pinto da Costa, to halt all building operations, which were only resumed after a consensus was reached.

Designed by Portuguese architect Manuel Salgado and built by Portuguese contractor Somague, it cost €97,755,318, of which €18,430,956 was subsidized by the government. To help underwrite costs, each stand carries one or two sponsor names: Super Bock (south), tmn (east), meo (west), and Coca-Cola (north stand). Away fans are placed in the right corner of the upper tier of the east stand, while home Ultra groups, Super Dragões and Colectivo Ultras 95, occupy the south stand and the north stand, respectively, like on the old stadium.

The stadium was inaugurated on November 16, 2003, with a match against FC Barcelona, which featured the debut of a 16-year-old Lionel Messi in the Spanish side. Porto won 2–0 with goals by Derlei and Hugo Almeida. Due to severe turf problems, however, Porto was forced to return and play in the old Estádio das Antas, until the turf was replanted by mid-February 2004.

The stadium is characterized by a frame of 21 000 m2 of azulejos.

Naming
Prior to the inauguration, the stadium's name was debated internally between elements of Porto's administration, with various alternatives in consideration, such as retaining the old name, Estádio das Antas (officially, unlike the former stadium), or name it after some of the club's biggest historical figures like former player Artur de Sousa Pinga, manager José Maria Pedroto or president Jorge Nuno Pinto da Costa, the latter being, the one with most gathered consensus but ended dismissed by the president himself. After a deliberation period, the name Estádio do Dragão was revealed to the general public.

International matches

Portugal national team matches
The following national team matches were held in the stadium.

UEFA Euro 2004
Constructed to become one of the venues of the UEFA Euro 2004 tournament, it staged the inaugural match between hosts Portugal and eventual winners Greece, as well as three group stage, one quarterfinal, and one semifinal fixtures.

2019 UEFA Nations League Finals
One of the venues of the 2019 UEFA Nations League Finals.

2021 UEFA Champions League Final

The final originally planned at the Atatürk Olympic Stadium in Istanbul, but was moved due to travel restrictions by England government caused by the COVID-19 pandemic in Turkey, the final hosts were shifted back a two-year, with Istanbul instead hosting the 2023 final. Chelsea FC won the match 1-0 against Manchester City, with Kai Havertz scoring the only goal.

Other uses

A major source of income granted by the infrastructure is the planned capability to monetize on organizing events outside of regular football matches. Those extend from business meetings, congresses, summits, festivals, expos and other sports competitions. For example, the ROC committee picked the stadium to host the 2009 Race of Champions South Europe Regional Final, therefore, the grass pitch was converted into an asphalt course in order to accommodate the race. The 2019 ESSMA Summit is also noteworthy by having joined several clubs, leagues and federations representatives together at the venue to discuss matters on the developments and trends of the football industry.

In addition, through different music promoters and specialized event management companies, the stadium already served as a concert venue to four international tour schedules from recognized musical artists along with selected opening acts.

Access and transportation

Access by vehicle is possible through the VCI (Via de Cintura Interna), a roadway that passes right next to the stadium, granting a direct connection. In the event of coming from the city center, driving down the main Alameda da Antas is another viable route towards the destination. In spite of this, the recommendation is the use of the public transports, which results in a better flux of public movement around the perimeter. Having its own station combined with the infrastructure, the metro functions as the main way of reaching the stadium, with different lines linking the various city areas and a direct connection to the international Francisco Sá Carneiro Airport. Alternatively, the STCP bus service also grants routes for the purpose and there are 150 bicycle parking spots available.

References

Bibliography

External links

Estádio do Dragão Official website
Estádio do Dragão at Structurae

FC Porto
Dragao
Dragao
Sports venues in Porto
Sports venues completed in 2003